Pierce Michael Bird (born 16 April 1999) is a Northern Irish professional footballer who plays as a centre back for AFC Fylde.

Career

Dunkirk
Bird played for Dunkirk of the East Midlands Counties League and also their reserve side, AFC Dunkirk of the Nottinghamshire Senior League.
He made his senior debut for Dunkirk on 9 August 2016 in the 3–2 home win against Holbrook Sports.
On 17 August 2016 in the away win at Cotgrave he made his debut for AFC Dunkirk.

Notts County
Bird sealed a trial at League Two side Notts County, and scored the winning goal in the pre-season win at York City, On 31 July it was announced that Bird had secured a one-year contract at Notts County after impressing during his trial period.
On 7 November 2017, Bird made his Notts County debut in the EFL Trophy match at Lincoln City, scoring an own goal.
On 26 December 2017, Bird made his Football League debut as an 87th-minute substitute in the 4–1 win at Morecambe.

On 29 May 2018, Bird signed a two-year contract with Notts County.

On 3 June 2020, out of contract Bird was informed he will not be offered a new contract when his current contract ends on 30 June.

Loan to Leek Town
On 9 September 2017, Bird joined Northern Premier League Division One South side Leek Town on a one-month loan, making his debut the same day in a 3–1 away win at Gresley.

Loan to Alfreton Town
On 5 January 2018, Bird joined National League North side Alfreton Town on a month youth loan. He made his debut the next day in the 3–0 win away at North Ferriby United, and also scored the third Alfreton goal.

Loan to Grantham Town
On 1 November 2018, Bird joined Northern Premier League Premier Division side Grantham Town on a one-month loan. He made his debut on 3 November in the 0–2 defeat to Warrington Town.

Loan to Boston United
On 22 November 2019, Bird joined National League North side Boston United until the end of the year.
He made his debut the next day in the F.A. Trophy 0–1 defeat at Atherton Collieries, and was substituted after 32 minutes, due to a head injury. On 19 December 2019, Bird was recalled from his loan spell.

Eastleigh
On 11 August 2020, Bird joined National League side Eastleigh.
Bird made his debut as a 105th-minute substitute in the F.A. Cup 1st Round defeat to Milton Keynes Dons on 8 November 2020. Bird scored in the penalty shoot-out where Eastleigh lost 4–3.

On 28 June 2021, Eastleigh confirmed that Bird will leave the club following the expiry of his contract, after turning down a new deal.

Loan to Boston United
On 18 December 2020, Bird joined National League North side Boston United, until 16 January 2021.
He made his debut the next day in the F.A. Trophy win against AFC Fylde.

King's Lynn Town
On 29 June 2021, Bird joined National League side King's Lynn Town.
He made his debut on 21 August 2021 in the National League home defeat against Southend United.

Loan to FC Halifax Town
On 25 March 2022, Bird joined fellow National League side FC Halifax Town on loan for the remainder of the 2021–22 season.
He made his debut on 9 April 2022 as an 87th-minute substitute in the National League home win against Woking.

AFC Fylde
On 24 June 2022, Bird joined National League North side AFC Fylde for an undisclosed fee.
He made his debut on 6 August 2022 in the National League North home victory against Kettering Town.

International career
On 30 August 2018, Bird received a call-up for the Northern Ireland under-21 squad for upcoming games against Luxembourg and Spain. Bird is eligible to represent Northern Ireland at international level through his grandparents.

On 6 September 2018, in the friendly against Luxembourg under-21 he made his debut in a 1–0 win. Bird was substituted in the 70th minute.

He made his competitive debut on 11 September 2018 as a 78th-minute substitute in Northern Ireland under-21s 2–1 victory away to Spain under-21 in the 2019 UEFA European Under-21 Championship qualifying competition.

Career statistics

References

Living people
Footballers from Nottingham
English footballers
English people of Northern Ireland descent
Northern Ireland under-21 international footballers
Notts County F.C. players
English Football League players
National League (English football) players
Northern Premier League players
East Midlands Counties Football League players
Dunkirk F.C. players
Leek Town F.C. players
Alfreton Town F.C. players
Grantham Town F.C. players
Boston United F.C. players
Eastleigh F.C. players
King's Lynn Town F.C. players
FC Halifax Town players
AFC Fylde players
Association football defenders
1999 births